East Limerick was a UK Parliament constituency in Ireland, returning one Member of Parliament 1885–1922.

Prior to the 1885 United Kingdom general election the area was part of the Limerick County constituency. From 1922 it was not represented in the UK Parliament, with the establishment of the Irish Free State on 6 December 1922.

Boundaries
This constituency comprised the eastern part of County Limerick.

1885–1922: The baronies of Clanwilliam, Coonagh, Coshlea, Kilmallock, Owneybeg, Pubblebrien and Smallcounty, and that part of the barony of Coshma not contained within the constituency of West Limerick.

Members of Parliament

Notes

Elections

Elections in the 1880s

Elections in the 1890s

Elections in the 1900s

Elections in the 1910s

References

Historic constituencies in County Limerick
Westminster constituencies in County Limerick (historic)
Dáil constituencies in the Republic of Ireland (historic)
Constituencies of the Parliament of the United Kingdom established in 1885
Constituencies of the Parliament of the United Kingdom disestablished in 1922